Tim Hardy is a retired American soccer defender who played professionally in the USL A-League and National Professional Soccer League.

Hardy graduated from LaSalle High School where he was an All State soccer player.  He attended Indiana University, where he played on the men's soccer team from 1992 to 1995.  In 1996, Hardy turned professional with the Richmond Kickers of the USISL Select League.  In the fall of 1996, Hardy moved indoors with the St. Louis Ambush of the National Professional Soccer League.  In 1998, Hardy signed with the Rochester Rhinos, playing for them for three seasons.  In addition to playing outdoors with the Rhinos, Hardy also spent the winters with the Buffalo Blizzard of the NPSL.  He finished his career with the Cleveland Crunch during the 2000–2001 NPSL season.

References

Living people
1973 births
American soccer players
Buffalo Blizzard players
Cleveland Crunch (NPSL) players
Indiana Hoosiers men's soccer players
National Professional Soccer League (1984–2001) players
Richmond Kickers players
Rochester New York FC players
St. Louis Ambush (1992–2000) players
A-League (1995–2004) players
USISL Select League players
Soccer players from Michigan
Association football defenders